SJ or S.J. may refer to:

Postnominal
 A member of the Society of Jesus (the Jesuits)

Places
 Saint John, New Brunswick, a city located in New Brunswick, Canada
 San Jose, California, a city located in Northern California, United States
 South Jersey, the southern half of the state of New Jersey
 St. John's, Newfoundland and Labrador, the capital city in Newfoundland and Labrador, Canada
 Subang Jaya, a residential hub in Klang Valley, Malaysia
 Suure-Jaani, Estonia
 Svalbard and Jan Mayen (ISO 3166-1 country code: SJ), two northern territories of Norway

Government, law, and politics

 Solicitors Journal
 Summary judgment, a legal motion
Social justice, movement for equality

Military

 Sitara-e-Jurat, Pakistan's third highest military award
 SJ radar, a type of S band (10-cm) radar set used on American submarines during the Second World War

Sports

 San Jose Sharks, a National Hockey League (NHL) team, based in San Jose, California
 Show Jumping, a sport on horseback
 Strafe-jumping, a trickjumping technique

Transportation

 Jeep Cherokee (SJ) 1974-1983
 Jeep SJ platform
 SJ, the Swedish State Railways 1887–2000
 SJ AB, the Swedish national railway passenger operator 2001—
 Sriwijaya Air (ICAO code: SJY), an Indonesia-based low-cost airline
 Freedom Air (ICAO code: FOM), an defunct Air New Zealand Group low-cost airline. 
 Statens järnvägar (English: Swedish State Railways), the government agency from which SJ AB was formed
 SuperJet, a personal water craft produced by Yamaha Motors
 Suzuki SJ 410 or 413, part of the  Suzuki Jimny series
 The tail code for aircraft from Seymour Johnson Air Force Base

Linguistics
 Sj-sound, a sound in northern Germanic languages with disputed articulation location

Literature
 S.J., initials used by Samuel Johnson

In arts and entertainment
 SJ (singer), American folk-pop singer
 Super Junior, a famous South Korean boyband
 Samurai Jack, an American animated television series
 Superjail!, an American animated television series
 SJ (rapper), British rapper and member of the UK drill group OFB

Other uses
Shijian, series of satellites built and operated by China